The three districts of Luxembourg were the top-level administrative divisions of the Grand Duchy of Luxembourg.  The districts were further subdivided into cantons, which still exist:

Diekirch District
Diekirch
Clervaux
Redange
Vianden
Wiltz
Grevenmacher District
Grevenmacher
Echternach
Remich
Luxembourg District
Luxembourg
Capellen
Esch-sur-Alzette
Mersch

The cantons were created on 24 February 1843.  In 1857, Mersch District was created from the cantons of Mersch and Redange.  However, this fourth district was abolished in 1867, when the re-arrangements of 1857 were undone.

The districts were abolished per 3 October 2015 leaving the Cantons, of which there are 12 as the most senior local authorities of Luxembourg

See also

ISO 3166-2:LU

Footnotes

 
Subdivisions of Luxembourg
Lists of subdivisions of Luxembourg
Luxembourg 1
Districts, Luxembourg